Olly Russell (born 21 September 1998) is an English professional rugby league footballer who plays as a  &  for the Huddersfield Giants in the English super league

In 2019 he spent time on loan from Huddersfield at the Leigh Centurions and the Batley Bulldogs in the Betfred Championship, as well as Workington Town in Betfred League 1.

Background
Russell was born in Oldham, England.

Russell played his junior amateur rugby for Oldham Saint Anne's.

Career

Huddersfield Giants
After a spell with Wigan, he moved to Huddersfield's academy side and was an integral part of their run to the academy grand final in 2018.
In 2018 he made his Super League début for Huddersfield against the Widnes Vikings.
On 28 May 2022, Russell played for Huddersfield in their 2022 Challenge Cup Final loss to Wigan.

Halifax Panthers (loan)
On 26 May 2021 it was reported that he had signed for the Halifax Panthers in the RFL Championship on loan.

References

External links
Huddersfield Giants profile
SL profile

1999 births
Living people
Batley Bulldogs players
England Knights national rugby league team players
English rugby league players
Halifax R.L.F.C. players
Huddersfield Giants players
Leigh Leopards players
Rugby league halfbacks
Rugby league players from Oldham
Workington Town players